Nothin' Like the Summer is the debut album of country music artist Carmen Rasmusen . It was released on iTunes on August 14, 2007, and was physically released on August 28, 2007 on Lofton Creek Records.

The first single, "Nothin' Like the Summer", was released on April 24, 2007 and failed to chart. "Stranded" was co-written by Kristyn Osborn, one third of the trio SHeDAISY.

Track listing 
"Happy" (Bob DiPiero, Karyn Rochelle) - 3:02
"Love Will Wait" (Wendell Mobley, Rachel Thibodeau) - 3:51
"Stranded" (Jason Deere, Kristyn Osborn) - 3:46
"Nothin' Like the Summer" (Carmen Rasmusen, Deere, Victoria Shaw) - 3:51
"Keep Me Forever Falling" (Deere, Katrina Elam) - 3:20
"Shine" (Deere, César Lemos) - 3:17
"Spend That Money" (Deere, Luke Dick, Matt Lopez) - 3:09
"Silly Me" (Sarah Buxton, Deere) - 3:44
"Your Love" (Jodi Marr, Shaw, James T. Slater) - 3:19
"You Scare Me to Death" (Rasmusen, Deere) - 3:18
"Gather Me Up" (Rasmusen, Deere) - 3:03

Personnel
Tim Akers – keyboards
Tom Bukovac – electric guitar
Gary Burnette – acoustic guitar
Joey Canaday – bass guitar
Penny Coleman – background vocals
J. T. Corenflos – electric guitar
Glen Duncan – fiddle
Larry Franklin – fiddle
Tommy Hardin – drums
Mark Hill – bass guitar
John Barlow Jarvis – keyboards
B. James Lowry – acoustic guitar
Kim Parent – background vocals
Scotty Sanders – steel guitar
Ilya Toshinsky – acoustic guitar, banjo, mandolin
Lonnie Wilson – drums

References

2007 debut albums
Lofton Creek Records albums
Carmen Rasmusen albums